Lauzerique is a surname. Notable people with the surname include:

Arnaldo Ramos Lauzerique, Cuban independent economist
George Lauzerique (born 1947), Cuban-American baseball player